The Treaty between Uruguay and Argentina concerning the Rio de la Plata and the Corresponding Maritime Boundary was signed in Montevideo on 19 November 1973 by Dr. Juan Carlos Blanco Estradé, Minister for Foreign Affairs of Uruguay and Mr. Alberto J. Vignes, Minister for Foreign Affairs and Worship of Argentina. 

The treaty provides the geographic coordinates for the boundary points in the Rio de la Plata, affords the status of Martín García Island and other islands in the Rio de la Plata, designates Isla Martin Garcia as the seat of an Administrative Commission for the Rio de la Plata (CARP), and regulates the adjacent maritime front.

There are two kinds of zones in the Rio de la Plata: the zones of exclusive jurisdiction and the zone of common jurisdiction. In zones considered to be of exclusive jurisdiction, each Party may exert its authority without interference from the other.  In the common zones these jurisdictions may be exercised concurrently and by the CARP. The inner waters of both countries are drawn intentionally to let the navigable waterways lie within the common zones. 
 
This combined definition of the boundary led to the Martín García canal dispute and the Uruguay River pulp mill dispute.

See also
Río de la Plata

References

External links
 United Nations website, Treaty between Uruguay and Argentina concerning the Rio de la Plata and the Corresponding Maritime Boundary 19 November 1973
 Legal  Regime  of the Rio  de la Plata by Lilian del Castillo Laborde.
 Argentina – Uruguay Boundary by The Geographer Office of the Geographer Bureau of Intelligence and Research

Argentina–Uruguay relations
Argentina–Uruguay border
La Plata basin
Treaties concluded in 1973
1973 in Uruguay
1973 in Argentina
Treaties of Argentina
Treaties of Uruguay
Boundary treaties